Mount Kosko is a peak,  high, standing  north of Mount Keltie in the Conway Range of Antarctica. It was mapped by the United States Geological Survey from tellurometer surveys and U.S. Navy air photos, 1959–63, and was named by the Advisory Committee on Antarctic Names for Arno Kosko, an ionosphere scientist at Byrd Station, 1963.

References

Mountains of Oates Land